Arthur St. George, a graduate of Trinity College, Dublin and the Chancellor of Clogher,  was a Seventeenth century Irish Anglican priest:  he was Dean of Ross, Ireland  from 1743 until 1772.

References

Alumni of Trinity College Dublin
Deans of Ross, Ireland
1772 deaths